Eupithecia asema is a moth in the  family Geometridae. It is found in southern India (Nilgiri Hills).

Adults are yellowish with well marked brown spots. The hindwings are very pale.

References

Moths described in 1859
asema
Moths of Asia